The 1985 Mid-American Conference men's basketball tournament was held March 5-7 at Centennial Hall in Toledo, Ohio.  Top-seeded Ohio defeated  in the championship game by  the score of 74–64 to win their second MAC men's basketball tournament and a bid to the NCAA tournament. There they lost to Kansas in the first round.  Ron Harper of runner-up Miami was named the tournament MVP.

Format
Seven of the ten MAC teams participated.  All games were played at Centennial Hall in Toledo, Ohio.

Bracket

References

Mid-American Conference men's basketball tournament
Tournament
MAC men's basketball tournament
MAC men's basketball tournament